Iskowitz is a surname. Notable people with the surname include:

Gershon Iskowitz (1921–1988), Polish-born Canadian artist 
Joel Iskowitz (born 1946), American designer, book illustrator, print artist and stamp, coin, and medal designer